Pedro Pablo Ramirez Menchaca (30 January 1884 – 12 May 1962) was the fascist-leaning President of Argentina from 7 June 1943, to 24 February 1944. He was the founder and leader of Guardia Nacional, Argentina's fascist militia.

Life and career
After graduating from the Argentine military college in 1904 as a second lieutenant, Ramírez was promoted in 1910 as first lieutenant of the cavalry. In 1911, he was sent to Germany for training with the Fifth Hussars cavalry in Kaiser Wilhelm II's Prussian Army. He returned home in 1913, with a German wife, prior to the outbreak of World War I. Advancing in rank as a specialist in cavalry tactics, he assisted fellow General José Félix Uriburu in an authoritarian coup that deposed Hipólito Yrigoyen in 1930. Ramírez was sent to Rome to observe Mussolini's army until his return in 1932.

When Uriburu set free elections and then died, General Ramírez worked behind the scenes to plan a return of fascism to Argentina. Over the next several years, he organized the Milicia Nacionalista (later the Guardia), and authored a program for a state ruled by the militia. In 1942, Ramírez was appointed War Minister by President Ramón Castillo, and began to reorganize the Argentine Army. At the same time, the Guardia Nacional joined with another party to form "Recuperacion Nacional," a fascist political party. Castillo fired Ramírez following a cabinet meeting on 18 May 1943. Two weeks later, on 4 June 1943, Ramírez assisted Arturo Rawson in overthrowing Castillo's government, and was again made Minister of War. Three days later, on 7 June Ramírez forced Rawson's resignation and maintained Argentina's neutrality during World War II. Because of this, the United States refused Argentine requests for Lend-Lease aid. Argentina finally declared war on Germany and Japan during the government of Edelmiro Farrell.

Despite having been brought to power through a coup d'état, Peronist historiography never calls him a dictator.

In popular culture
Ramirez makes a brief appearance in the film Evita during the song "The Lady's Got Potential", which depicts Juan Perón's rise to power. Here he is depicted as a very elderly man, played by Hector Malamud.

References

External links

 
 

1884 births
1962 deaths
Argentine generals
Argentine anti-communists
Presidents of Argentina
World War II political leaders
Argentine people of Spanish descent
People from Entre Ríos Province
Burials at La Chacarita Cemetery
Leaders who took power by coup
Leaders ousted by a coup
Defense ministers of Argentina